Chris Matthews (born 1945) is an American talk-show host.

Chris Matthews or Christopher Matthews may also refer to:

 Chris Matthews (gridiron football) (born 1989), American football wide receiver
 Chris Matthews (cricketer) (born 1962), Australian cricketer
 Chris Matthews (musician), New Zealand rock musician
 Chris Matthews, American businessman, former Chairman of Hay Group
 Chris Matthews (Australian musician), Australian country musician
 Christopher Matthews (businessman) (1950–2004), British businessman

See also
Christopher Matthew (born 1939), British writer and broadcaster